Mina Fürst Holtmann (born 17 July 1995) is a Norwegian World Cup alpine ski racer and specializes in the technical events of slalom and giant slalom. She represents the sports club Bærums SK.

Career
Fürst Holtmann competed without finishing at the 2012 Winter Youth Olympics, later competed at the Junior World Championships in 2014, and the following year she won three medals (bronze, silver, and gold). She made her World Cup debut in January 2015 in St. Moritz, where she also collected her first World Cup points with a 29th-place finish on the second race day.

Following a lengthy injury, Fürst Holtmann returned to the World Cup circuit in October 2017, and recorded her first top-15 finish with a 13th place in Levi that November.  Her first World Cup podium was in December 2019, with a runner-up in a giant slalom at Courchevel, France.

World Cup results

Season standings

Race podiums
 0 wins
 2 podiums – (1 GS, 1 SL); 17 top tens (7 GS, 10 SL)

World Championship results

Olympic results

References

External links
 
 
 

1995 births
Living people
Sportspeople from Bærum
Norwegian female alpine skiers
Alpine skiers at the 2012 Winter Youth Olympics
Alpine skiers at the 2022 Winter Olympics
Olympic alpine skiers of Norway
Medalists at the 2022 Winter Olympics
Olympic medalists in alpine skiing
Olympic bronze medalists for Norway
21st-century Norwegian women